In phonetics and phonology, an alveolar stop is a type of consonantal sound, made with the tongue in contact with the alveolar ridge located just behind the teeth (hence alveolar), held tightly enough to block the passage of air (hence a stop consonant). The 2-D finite element mode of the front part of the midsagittal tongue can stimulate the air pressed release of an alveolar stop. Alveolar consonants in children's productions have generally been demonstrated to undergo smaller vowel-related coarticulatory effects than labial and velar consonants, thus yielding consonant-specific patterns similar to those observed in adults.

The upcoming vowel target is adjusted to demand force and effort during the coarticulating process. More generally, several kinds are distinguished:

 , voiceless alveolar plosive
 , voiced alveolar plosive
 , voiced alveolar nasal
 , voiceless alveolar nasal
 , alveolar ejective
 , voiced alveolar implosive
  or  voiceless alveolar implosive (very rare)

Note that alveolar and dental stops are not always carefully distinguished.  Acoustically, the two types of sounds are similar, and it is rare for a language to have both types.

A dental consonant can be transcribed with the combining bridge below , and a postalveolar consonant with the retraction diacritic, the combining minus sign below .

References 

Alveolar consonants
Plosives